Il Romito is a village in Tuscany, central Italy, administratively a frazione of the comune of Pontedera, province of Pisa. At the time of the 2001 census its population was 1,111.

Il Romito is about 28 km from Pisa and 2 km from Pontedera.

References 

Frazioni of the Province of Pisa